Mokwa is a surname. Notable people with the surname include:

 Joe Mokwa (born 1959), American police officer
 Tomasz Mokwa (born 1993), Polish footballer

See also
 

Polish-language surnames